The 1935–36 League of Ireland was the fifteenth season of the League of Ireland. Dolphin were the defending champions.

Bohemians won their fifth title.

Overview
Two teams were elected to the League: Brideville, who returned after a three-year absence, and Reds United.

Teams

Table

Results

Top goalscorers

See also 

 1935–36 FAI Cup

Ireland
Lea
League of Ireland seasons